Belgium was represented by the band Clouseau, with the song "Geef het op", at the 1991 Eurovision Song Contest, which took place in Rome on 4 May.

Before Eurovision

National final 
Clouseau were chosen internally by broadcaster BRTN to be that year's Belgian representatives. On 9 March 1991, during a live broadcast called Euro-Clouseau hosted by Jessica de Caluwe from the Casino Cursaal in Ostend, Clouseau performed a number of songs, three of which ("Geef het op", "Hilda" and "Ik kan zonder jou") were new. The band made their own choice from the three songs and announced "Geef het op" as the song they would perform in Rome.

At Eurovision 
On the night of the final Clouseau performed 18th in the running order, following Germany and preceding Spain. At the close of the voting "Geef het op" had received 23 points from seven countries (the highest being 5 from France and Italy), placing Belgium 16th out of 22 entries. The Belgian jury awarded its 12 points to Switzerland.

Voting

References

External links 
 Belgian Preselection 1991

1991
Countries in the Eurovision Song Contest 1991
Eurovision